Jonathan I. Goudeau is an American politician serving as a member of the Louisiana House of Representatives from the 31st district. He assumed office on January 13, 2020.

Career 
Goudeau lives in Lafayette, Louisiana. Prior to entering politics, he worked for the Lafayette Parish Sheriff's Office. He was elected to the Louisiana House of Representatives in November 2019 and assumed office in January 2020. Goudeau is a member of the House Conservative Caucus.

Goudeau supports, and voted for passage out of committee, a bill in the Louisiana state legislature that would make in vitro fertilization (IVF) treatments and some forms of birth control a crime, and prosecute women who get abortions for murder. The draft bill has no exceptions for rape, incest, or the protection of the life of the mother

References 

Living people
Republican Party members of the Louisiana House of Representatives
People from Lafayette, Louisiana
Year of birth missing (living people)